The flag of Easter Island is the flag of Easter Island, a special territory of Chile. It was first flown in public alongside the national flag on 9 May 2006.

Depiction 

It is a white flag featuring in center a reimiro (a wooden pectoral ornament once worn by the people of Rapa Nui) painted in red (mana), a symbol of power, with two anthropomorphic figures at its edges, representing the Ariki ('chiefs, nobles').

A variant distinctively features four black Tangata manu ('bird-man') at each corner of the flag.

History
The Te Reva Reimiro was created by the local population in 1880 for the island to adopt the apparatus of a modern state and hold a state-to-state dialogue with Chile, which eventually annexed the island in 1888.

For many years, the flag was unofficially used by the island's Polynesian population to represent their island, however the official flag was the white and gold flag of the "Municipality of Easter Island". In 2006, it was upgraded to a "Special Territory" and optional use of the Rapa Nui name was allowed in government documents for the first time, with the Reimiro flag adopted as the entity's flag.

References

Flag
Flags of Chile
National flags
Flags introduced in 2006
Flag
Flags of indigenous peoples
Red and white flags